Sun and Concrete is a 2023 German coming-of-age and crime film co-written and directed by David Wnendt. The film based on the graphic novel of the same name by Felix Lobrecht, stars Levy Rico Arcos, Rafael Luis Klein-Heßling, Vincent Wiemer and Aaron Maldonado-Morales. It is about four classmates, who break into their school in Berlin-Gropiusstadt in the hope of solving their money problems. It is selected at the 73rd Berlin International Film Festival in Berlinale Special Gala, where it will have its world premiere on 18 February 2023. It is scheduled for release in cinemas on 2 March 2023.

Cast

 Levy Rico Arcos as Lukas
 Rafael Luis Klein-Heßling as Gino
 Vincent Wiemer as Julius
 Aaron Maldonado-Morales as Sanchez
 Luvre47 as Marco
 Wael Alkhatib as Djamel
 Lucio101 as Cem
 Jörg Hartmann as Matthias
 Imran Chaaban as Momo
 Franziska Wulf as Gaby
 Bernd Grawert as Mr. Schiezeth
 Nicole Johannhanwer as Karin
 Gerdy Zint as Adi
 Felix Lobrecht as Shoot
 B-Tight as Kris
 Roland Wolf as Mr Reuter 
 Jörg Rühl as Policeman Werner 
 Marzia Tedeschi as Giovanna 
 David Ruland as Steinfeld 
 Jonathan Wirtz	as Fabian 
 Leon Ullrich as Mr. Sonnabend 
 Ali Haydar Kocak as Chief 
 Inaam Al Battat as Djamel's mother 
 Arda Gorkem as student 
 Jan Born as student

Production
The film is adapted from the novel of the same name by Felix Lobrecht, he also wrote the screenplay together with director David Wnendt. The audition for roles was conducted from over 5,000 young people from all over Germany. Levy Rico Arcos, Vincent Wiemer, Rafael Luis Klein-Hessling and Aaron Maldonado-Morales made it to the final cast along with Jörg Hartmann, Franziska Wulf and musicians and hip-hop stars like Luvre47, Lucio101, Juju, Olexesh, NNOC, Azzi Memo, Klapse Mane and AOB.

Filming began on 25 June 2021 and was wrapped up on 11 September 2021 after 59 days of shooting in Berlin-Gropiusstadt.

Release
Sun and Concrete will have its  premiere on 18 February 2023 as part of the 73rd Berlin International Film Festival, in Berlinale Gala Special. It is scheduled to release in cinemas on 2 March 2023.

Reception

Jan Lumholdt reviewing for Cineuropa praised David Wnendt's handling of images and performances of ensamble writing, ".... who all handle their parts with brio." In the end Lumholdt wrote, "Not least, there’s the area itself, relentlessly captured on location – concrete, sun and all – which is very much the main character."

Accolades

References

External links

 Sun and Concrete at Berlinale
 Sun and Concrete at Film portal 
 

2023 films
2020s crime films
German crime films
2023 crime films
2020s German-language films
2020s German films